Walter Robinson may refer to:

 Walter Robinson (cricketer) (1851–1919), English cricketer
 Walter George Robinson (1873–?), insurance and loan agent and political figure in Saskatchewan, Canada
 Walter Robinson (baseball) (born 1908), American Negro leagues baseball player
 Walter Robinson (bishop) (1919–1975), Anglican Bishop of Dunedin
 Walter V. Robinson, American journalist and journalism professor
 Walter Robinson (artist) (born 1950), American art critic and artist
 Walter Robinson (composer), African American composer
 Walter Allen Robinson, British administrator and principal of Aitchison College, Lahore
 Newt Robinson (Walter Robinson), American baseball player